The Men's individual event of the Biathlon World Championships 2013 was held on 14 February 2013. 135 athletes participated over a course of 20 km.

Results
The race was started at 17:15.

References

Men's individual